Neophytus VI, (? – 1747) was Ecumenical Patriarch of Constantinople for two terms, from 1734 to 1740 and from 1743 to 1744.

Life
Neophytus was born in Patmos, and when the Metropolitan of Caesarea in Cappadocia was elected to the Patriarchate as  Jeremias III, he was elected in his place as Metropolitan of Caesarea. As Metropolitan of Caesarea, his more important act was restoring in 1728 the monastery of Saint John the Forerunner at Zincidere in Cappadocia.

He was appointed as Patriarch on 27 Sept 1734 supported by the Dragoman of the Porte, the fanariote Alexander Ghikas. His subjection to the Dragoman caused the Grand Vizier to order his deposition six years later, in August 1740. Neophytus reigned again for a short term, from May 1743 to March 1744, and during this term he was ordered by the Grand Vizier not to have any contact with Alexander Ghikas.

His Patriarchal reign was not marked by any particular event, and Neophytus mainly dealt with monastic issues. He had letters with Nicolaus Zinzendorf, the reformer of the Moravian Church, but without any result. After his second and final deposition, he was exiled in Patmos where he died in February or March 1747.

Notes

|-

17th-century births
1747 deaths
18th-century Ecumenical Patriarchs of Constantinople
People from Patmos